King of the Road is a studio album by the California stoner rock band Fu Manchu, released in 2000. Many of the songs are about cars and car culture. 

The Japanese and European releases contain the track "Breathing Fire" in place of "Drive". "Breathing Fire" was on the demo version of the record that was sent to radio stations, clubs, and fans.

Production
The album was produced by Joe Barresi at Monkey Studios. It was recorded live in the studio, where the band experimented with fuzz pedal tones. King of the Road contains a cover of Devo's "Freedom of Choice", which was praised by Mark Mothersbaugh.

Critical reception
The Austin Chronicle wrote: "King of the Road is another rock & roll road trip back to the early days of the Carter administration, sounding like an album that could have been made in 1977 ... It's full of obscenely fat guitar licks à la Frehley, Blackmore, Iommi (and the most perfect AC/DC break you've ever heard in the middle of 'Over the Edge'); treble-free tones; and more songs about driving and vans. It'd be stupid if it weren't so thoroughly convincing and didn't rock so unrelentingly." The Morning Call wrote that "like the Ramones (and most great rock 'n' roll in general), the [monolithic] concept is based on visceral rather than cerebral response." The Riverfront Times deemed the album "a happy hunting ground of beefy, bong-rattling RAWK AND ROLLLLL." The Chicago Tribune called it "one bad, bone-jarring tour of the Great Riff Valley in all its arid, inhospitable majesty."

The Washington Post opined that "true believers might call Fu Manchu's approach to headbanging odes of the road conceptually pure; skeptics could deem it moronic." The Boston Globe thought that "guitarists [Scott] Hill and Bob Balch's aptitude for the big guitar sound popularized by Kiss and AC/DC locks into a monster rhythm section, ensuring that listeners are laughing with Fu Manchu, never at them." In a review of Fu Manchu's next album, California Crossing, USA Today deemed King of the Road a "creative peak" and "a stoner milestone of turbo-revved guitars and West Coast slackerdom." The New York Times advised: "Think Tommy Lee riffing with Jerry Garcia."

Track listing

Personnel 
Scott Hill – vocals, guitar
Brant Bjork – drums
Bob Balch – guitar
Brad Davis – bass

Production
Joe Barresi – producer
All songs written by Bob Balch, Brant Bjork, Brad Davis and Scott Hill, except "Freedom Of Choice": written by Mark Mothersbaugh and Gerald Casale
All tracks recorded, mixed and engineered at Monkey Studios, Palm Desert, CA, except "Hell On Wheels" mixed at Sound City Studios, Van Nuys, CA
Assistant engineer: Steve Feldman
Mastered by Dave Collins A&M Studios, Los Angeles, CA
Live photo: C. Taylor Crothers
Band photo: Alex Obleas
Art direction: Lane Wurster
Graphic design: Christopher Eselgroth

References

2000 albums
Fu Manchu (band) albums
Mammoth Records albums
Albums produced by Joe Barresi